Playing House is a 2011 American direct-to-video thriller film directed by Tom Vaughan starring Shelley Calene-Black, Alex Dorman and Mari E. Ferguson in lead roles.

Plot
In order to afford their dream house, newlyweds Jen and Mitch Mckenzie ask their best friend Danny to move in with them. The plan works beautifully until Danny brings home Blair, a stunning and beautiful temptress. Blair tries to seduce Mitch with her beauty and sex appeal when she is with Danny. This makes Mitch make behavioral changes towards Jen. Later, Blair electrocutes Danny in his bath tub. Then, it is revealed that Blair's earlier boyfriends had also died in some way after meeting her. After Danny's death Mitch allows Blair to stay in the house and is falling to her temptations. This widens the gap between Jen and him. Jen leaves the house and starts working as head chef in a hotel.

In a market store, Blair is confronted by Sharon who tries to blackmail her and warns her that she knows how she killed her boyfriends just for their money. On their next meeting, Blair kills Sharon and hides her body in the house. Later that night Blair, tries to seduce Mitch but he refuses her, remembering of Jen. Angered by his reaction, Blair then tries to kill him but is interrupted by the arrival of Jen back at the house. A fight ensues between the two and Blair is killed by Jen when she is run over by Jen's car. Mitch is saved and both unite when the police arrive at the scene.

Cast
 Shelley Calene-Black as Sharon
 Alex Dorman as Tiffany
Mari E. Ferguson as Widow
 Caleb George as Eric
Mayra Leal as Blair
 Matt Lusk	 as Danny Hockman
 Kevin Parker as Steve
 Sarah Prikryl as Jen McKenzie
 Celeste Roberts as Dr. Nicole Hardy
 Craig Welzbacher as Mitch McKenzie

References

External links
 
 Official Website

2011 films
2011 direct-to-video films
2011 psychological thriller films
Films set in Houston
Films shot in Houston
Films shot in Texas
American psychological thriller films
2010s English-language films
2010s American films